The United Pensioners of Italy, whose complete name is Italian Federation United Pensioners (F.I.P.U.), is a political party in Italy. The party was affiliated to the "House of Freedoms", the centre-right coalition led by Silvio Berlusconi, in the 2006 general election.

In 2006, after the fusion with the Pensioners' Movement (Movimento Pensionati), led by Roberto Olivato, the party has changed its name into United Pensioners – Pensioners' Movement (Pensionati Uniti – Movimento Pensionati).

Pensioners' parties
1987 establishments in Italy
Political parties established in 1987
Single-issue parties in Italy